Jean Laurent may refer to:

 Jean Laurent (photographer) (1816–1886), French photographer who worked in Spain
 Jean Laurent (footballer) (1906–1995), French footballer
 Jean Antoine Laurent, miniaturist and painter
 Jean Laurent Ravera, Monegasque swimmer